The 13009 / 13010 Doon Express is an Express train belonging to Indian Railways – Eastern Railway zone that runs between  & Yog Nagari Rishikesh railway station in India.

It operates as train number 13009 from Howrah Junction to Yog Nagari Rishikesh and as train number 13010 in the reverse direction, serving the state of West Bengal, Jharkhand, Bihar, Uttar Pradesh & Uttarakhand.

Coaches

The 13009/13010 Doon Express presently has 1 AC 2 tier, 3 AC 3 tier, 11 Sleeper class, 3 General Unreserved, military coach & 2 SLR (Seating cum Luggage Rake) coaches. It does not have a pantry car.

As is customary with most train services in India, coach composition may be amended at the discretion of Indian Railways depending on demand.

Service

The 13009 Doon Express covers the distance of 1557 kilometres in 34 hours 55 mins (45 km/hr) & in 34 hours 30 mins as 13010 Doon Express (45.13 km/hr).

As the average speed of the train is below 55 km/hr, as per Indian Railways rules, its fare does not include a Superfast surcharge.

Routeing

Traction

Timings

 13009 Doon Express leaves Howrah on a daily basis at 20:25 hrs IST and reaches Yog Nagari Rishikesh at 05:30 hrs IST on the 3rd day.
 13010 Doon Express leaves Dehradun on a daily basis at 20:50 hrs IST and reaches Howrah at 07:00 hrs IST on the 3rd day.

Accidents

On 31 May 2012, 5 people died and 50 were injured when the train derailed at Mahrawa station.

On 28 April 2014, the Doon Express derailed close to Zafarganj station near Ambedkar Nagar in Uttar Pradesh killing 3 and injuring 6 people.

References

External links
 
 
 

Rail transport in Howrah
Trains from Dehradun
Railway services introduced in 1925
Named passenger trains of India
Rail transport in West Bengal
Rail transport in Jharkhand
Rail transport in Bihar
Rail transport in Uttar Pradesh
Express trains in India